Johannes Seigfried Anderson (July 20, 1887 – April 15, 1950) was a Finnish-born U.S. Army soldier during World War I, and a Medal of Honor recipient.

Biography
Little is known of Anderson's early life, other than that he was born in Finland July 20, 1887, and entered the US Army in Chicago, Illinois June 19, 1916. On October 8, 1918, while fighting near Consenvoye, France, while his unit was pinned down by heavy Austro-Hungarian machine gun fire, First Sergeant Anderson volunteered to leave his unit in an attempt at flanking the enemy machine gun emplacement. He made his advance under heavy fire, over open ground, reaching the emplacement and killing the machine gun crew. He silenced the machine gun, captured it, and returned with twenty-three prisoners of war.

He died April 15, 1950, and is buried in Acacia Park Cemetery and Mausoleum Chicago, Illinois.

Medal of Honor Citation

Rank and organization: First Sergeant, U.S. Army, Company B, 132d Infantry, 33d Division.
Place and date: At Consenvoye, France, October 8, 1918.
Entered service at: Chicago, Ill., June 19, 1916 
Birth: Finland.
General Orders No.16, War Department, 1919.

Citation:

While his company was being held up by intense artillery and machinegun fire, 1st Sgt. Anderson, without aid, voluntarily left the company and worked his way to the rear of the nest that was offering the most stubborn resistance. His advance was made through an open area and under constant hostile fire, but the mission was successfully accomplished, and he not only silenced the gun and captured it, but also brought back with him 23 prisoners.

See also

List of Medal of Honor recipients
List of Medal of Honor recipients for World War I

Notes

References

1887 births
1950 deaths
United States Army personnel of World War I
United States Army Medal of Honor recipients
Finnish emigrants to the United States (1809–1917)
United States Army non-commissioned officers
Foreign-born Medal of Honor recipients
World War I recipients of the Medal of Honor
Burials at Acacia Park Cemetery, Norwood Park Township